Events of 2020 in North Korea.

Incumbents 
 Party Chairman and State Chairman: Kim Jong-un
 President of the Supreme People's Assembly: Choe Ryong-hae
 Premier: Kim Jae-ryong (until 13 August), Kim Tok-hun (from 13 August)

Events

January
 In Late January, North Korea closes its borders due to the COVID-19 pandemic.

February

March
 In early March, according to South Korean media outlet Daily NK, 180 soldiers of the Korean Military had died causing speculation on if the deaths were a result of the COVID-19 pandemic.
 In March, North Korea launches several missile tests.
 On March 30, the 2020 Summer Olympics in which North Korean athletes were expected to compete in were postponed to summer of 2021 due to concerns over the COVID-19 pandemic.

April
 On April 12, Kim Jong Un was reported by Daily NK to have undergone cardiovascular surgery.
 On April 15, North Korea celebrates Day of the Sun. Kim Jong Un is missing from the ceremony.
 On April 21, CNN reports U.S. agencies monitoring intelligence from North Korea said Kim's post-surgery state was in "grave danger".

May

June and July
 On June 15, North Korea demolished a South Korean and North Korean liaison office building located in Kaesong after tensions between North and South Korea rise.
July 26 – The city of Kaesong is placed under total lockdown after a person is found with suspected COVID-19 symptoms. This is the first suspected case in the country.

October
On October 10, North Korea unveiled the missile Hwasong-16.

Deaths

January
 January 17 – Hwang Sun-hui, North Korean politician, director of the Korean Revolution Museum. (b. 1919)

April
 April 9 – Won Pyong-oh, South Korean zoologist, born in North Korea and escaped during the Korean War, son of Won Hong-gu. (b. 1929)

June
 June 9 – Kim Chang-sop, former Vice minister of the Ministry of State Security up until his death. (b. 1949)

July
 July 10 – Paik Sun-yup, North Korean born, South Korean military officer. (b. 1920)

References

Further reading 

 
2020s in North Korea
Years of the 21st century in North Korea
North Korea
North Korea